The 1996 season is the 43rd year in Guangzhou Football Club's existence, their 29th season in the Chinese football league and the 3rd season in the professional football league.

Squad

Transfers

Winter

 In

 Out

Summer

 In

 Out

Match results

Friendly matches

Jia-A League

FA Cup

Notes and references

Guangzhou F.C. seasons
Chinese football clubs 1996 season